Anthony Smith may refer to:

Sports
 Anthony Smith (fighter) (born 1988), American mixed martial artist
 Anthony Smith (defensive end) (born 1967), American football player
 Anthony Smith (safety) (born 1983), American football player
 Anthony Smith (Australian footballer) (born 1951), Australian rules footballer
 Anthony Smith (cricketer) (born 1930), English cricketer
 Anthony Smith (basketball) (born 1997), American basketball player

Entertainment
 Anthony Smith (producer) (1938–2021), British broadcaster, author and academic
 Anthony Smith (sculptor) (born 1984), British sculptor
 Anthony Smith (singer), American country music singer
 Anthony Neil Smith, American mystery and crime fiction writer

Politics
 Anthony Smith (politician) (1844–?), senator from West Virginia
 Anthony Charles Smith (born 1950), Liberal Party of Australia politician
 Anthony Thomas Smith (1935–2017), British lawyer and Liberal Party politician

Other
 Anthony Smith (explorer) (1926–2014), British science writer and balloonist, RAF pilot
 Anthony Smith (rescuer) (1894–1964), George Cross recipient for civilian action in WWII
 Anthony D. Smith (1939–2016), British sociologist
 Tone Loc (born 1966), American musician, birth name Anthony Terrell Smith
 Anthony Lamar Smith, an American man who was killed by a police officer in 2011; see Shooting of Anthony Lamar Smith
 Anthony Smith (born 2008), American hearing-impaired 4-year old comic book fan; see Blue Ear
 Antony Smith, a murdered Canadian gang member of the Dixon City Bloods gang; see Timeline of Rob Ford video scandal
 Tony Hudgell (born 2014), a charity fundraiser, birthname

See also

 
Tony Smith (disambiguation)
Antonio Smith (disambiguation)
List of people with surname Smith
Anthony Smyth, one of the Florida Four involved in gun smuggling